I Hope for You is a 1992 Russian-Belorussian romantic drama film directed by Elena Tsyplakova.

Plot 
The film tells about a woman who abandoned her child and attempted suicide, as a result of which she ended up in a psychiatric hospital, and after treatment got a job in an orphanage.

Cast 
 Irina Rozanova as Ira
 Natalya Sokoreva as Vika (as Natasha Sokoreva)
 Evgeniya Dobrovolskaya as Alla
 Tatyana Markhel as Principal
 Natalya Fisson as Marina
 Vladimir Ilyin as Vika's Grandpa
 Dmitriy Pevtsov as Kolyunya
 Margarita Shubina as Svetka
 Galina Makarova as Matveyevna
 Natalya Fedortsova as Lena Komarova
 Oksana Sivuga as Gyuzel

References

External links 
 

1992 films
1990s Russian-language films
Russian romantic drama films
1992 romantic drama films